Jack Crouch may refer to:

Jack Dyer Crouch, II (born 1958), American federal-government official and academic
Jack Crouch (baseball) (1903–1972), Major League Baseball catcher
Jack D. Crouch (1915–1989), American entrepreneur and conglomerate organizer

See also 
John Crouch (disambiguation)